Richard Quine (November 12, 1920June 10, 1989) was an American director, actor, and singer.

He began acting as a child in radio, vaudeville, and stage productions before being signed to Metro-Goldwyn-Mayer in his early twenties. When his acting career began to wane after World War II, Quine began working as a film director. He later moved into producing and directing television. Quine's films as director include Bell, Book and Candle (1958), The World of Suzie Wong (1960), Paris When It Sizzles (1964), How to Murder Your Wife (1965), and The Prisoner of Zenda (1979).

Career

Child actor
Born in Detroit, Quine's father was an actor. Quine's family moved to Los Angeles when he was six years old.

As a child, he began working as a radio actor and became a minor radio star. He then appeared in vaudeville before moving on to stage roles.

Quine made his film debut in the drama Cavalcade (1933). He could also be seen in The World Changes (1933) (alongside a young Mickey Rooney), Counsellor-at-Law (1933), Jane Eyre (1934, as John Reed), Dames (1934), Wednesday's Child (1934) with Frankie Thomas, Little Men (1934), Life Returns (1935), A Dog of Flanders (1935) with Thomas, and Dinky (1935) with Jackie Cooper.

New York
Quine left Los Angeles for New York City to return to stage acting.

In 1939, Quine made his Broadway debut in the Jerome Kern/Oscar Hammerstein II stage musical Very Warm for May in 1939, which ran for 59 performances. The following year, he was cast as Frank Lippincott in the hit Broadway production of My Sister Eileen starring Shirley Booth which was a hit.

MGM actor
His role in the stage version of My Sister Eileen led to Quine's being signed with Metro-Goldwyn-Mayer. Quine's first film for MGM was Babes on Broadway (1941), starring Judy Garland and Mickey Rooney. Rooney and Quine had been friends since childhood.

While at MGM, Quine also appeared in Tish (1942), with Susan Peters who would later become his second wife, and For Me and My Gal (1942), playing Judy Garland's brother. Columbia borrowed him to reprise his stage role in My Sister Eileen (1942).

At MGM he had a good role in Dr. Gillespie's New Assistant (1942), alongside Peters, and was in Stand by for Action (1942) and the propaganda short The Rear Gunner (1943).

Walter Wanger borrowed Quine for We've Never Been Licked (1943), a wartime propaganda drama, where Quine was top billed.

Just as his acting career seemed about to take off, he had to serve in the United States Coast Guard. While in the Coast Guard, he became a lieutenant and served in public relations department in San Diego, California.

After the war, Quine's acting career stalled. He appeared in The Cockeyed Miracle (1946), Words and Music (1948) and Command Decision (1948).

Columbia and becoming a film director
Quine and friend William Asher then decided to get into production and directing. The two set about adapting "Leather Gloves," a short story that appeared in the Saturday Evening Post. The story was later adapted by another writer, but Quine and Asher were hired to produce and direct the 1948 film version released by Columbia Pictures.

Reportedly Harry Cohn offered to buy the script outright but they wanted to direct. Cohn responded: "How the hell do you think you can make a picture?" But then later another Columbia executive told Quine, "Mr. Cohn tells me you're going to direct a picture."
 
He was still under contract to MGM when the film was made. The film was successful and Quine was hired to a long-term contract at Columbia.

Quine continued to act for a while. He was third billed in The Clay Pigeon (1949), a low budget noir directed by Richard Fleischer and written by Carl Foreman at RKO. He had support roles in No Sad Songs for Me (1950) and Rookie Fireman (1950), both at Columbia.

At Columbia he directed some comedy shorts: A Slip and a Miss (1950) with Hugh Herbert, Foy Meets Girl (1950) with Eddie Foy, Jr, The Awful Sleuth with Bert Wheeler, and Woo-Woo Blues (1951) with Herbert.

In July 1951 he signed a seven-year contract with Columbia to direct.

Quine's first solo effort as director was the musical comedy The Sunny Side of the Street (1951) starring Frankie Laine. He followed it with Purple Heart Diary (1951) with Frances Langford.

Collaboration with Blake Edwards
Quine then directed a series of films he co wrote with Blake Edwards: Sound Off (1952) with Mickey Rooney, Rainbow 'Round My Shoulder (1952) with Frankie Laine, All Ashore (1953) with Rooney and Dick Haymes, and Cruisin' Down the River (1954) with Haymes. These were all musicals but they also made a film noir, Drive a Crooked Road (1954) with Rooney. Without Edwards, Quine directed Siren of Bagdad (1953), for producer Sam Katzman.

Quine and Edwards entered television with The Mickey Rooney Show (1954–55) which lasted for a season of 34 episodes. Quine created it and Edwards was chief writer.

Without Edwards, Quine directed episodes of Footlights Theater, General Electric Theater, and The Ford Television Theatre.

Quine directed the film noir Pushover (1954) that launched Kim Novak as a star. Universal-International borrowed him to direct Tony Curtis in a musical, So This Is Paris (1954).

Quine helped Edwards write the film that became Edwards' first feature as director, Bring Your Smile Along (1955) with Laine. Edwards and Quine wrote the script for a musical remake of My Sister Eileen (1955), which Quine directed, and He Laughed Last (1956), which Edwards directed.

Leading director/producer
By then Quine was established as one of Columbia's leading directors. His films included The Solid Gold Cadillac (1956) and Full of Life (1956) with Judy Holliday; Operation Mad Ball (1957) with Jack Lemmon and Ernie Kovacs, with Blake Edwards helping write the script; Bell, Book and Candle (1958) with James Stewart, Novak, Kovacs and Lemmon. He made It Happened to Jane (1959) with Doris Day and Lemmon, produced by Day's film production company, Arwin Productions.

Quine set up his own film production company, Quine Productions, and secured a financing and distribution deal through Columbia Pictures. Quin Productions' first film was Strangers When We Meet (1960) with Kirk Douglas, Novak and Kovaks; the film was co-produced with Douglas' film production company, Bryna Productions.

Ray Stark hired him at the last minute to replace Jean Negulesco on The World of Suzie Wong (1960) with William Holden and Nancy Kwan at Paramount. Back at Columbia Quine did the narration for The Wackiest Ship in the Army (1960)  with Lemmon.

Quine announced he would do several projects for his own company: The Image Makers with Glenn Ford, Roar Like a Dove with Doris Day, and The Fannie Brice Story for Ray Stark. He was also going to do Man Hunt in Kenya with William Holden. None of these films were made.

He produced and directed Lemmon, Fred Astaire and Novak in The Notorious Landlady (1962), co written by Edwards.

He was going to make A Bolt Out of the Blue and Fair Game with Holden and direct Sherlock Holmes on Broadway. None of these projects happened.

Quine directed and produced Paris When It Sizzles (1964) with Holden and Audrey Hepburn, done for his own company via Paramount. He went to Warner Bros. to direct Sex and the Single Girl (1964) with Curtis and Natalie Wood, then did How to Murder Your Wife (1965) with Lemmon.

Quine produced and directed Synanon (1965) for Columbia, a little seen film about addicts. He returned to TV producing and directing episodes of the short-lived The Jean Arthur Show (1966). That series also lasted one season.

Quine directed Hotel (1967) for Warners. He was going to film Across the River and into the Trees but it was never made.

Instead he did two films for Paramount, Oh Dad, Poor Dad, Mamma's Hung You in the Closet and I'm Feelin' So Sad (1967) for Ray Stark, and A Talent for Loving (1969). He was also meant to film The Owl and the Pussycat but Herbert Ross ended up doing it, with Barbra Streisand and George Segal.

Lyricist
In addition to producing, directing and screenwriting, Quine was a lyricist. He wrote the lyrics "Be Prepared," a song included in the film It Happened to Jane (1959), which he also produced and directed. In 1962, Quine wrote two songs, "Going Steady With a Dream" and "Strangers When We Meet," the latter the theme to the 1960 film of the same name, which Quine directed, and also for the film Don't Knock the Twist. Quine also wrote the theme song to his 1964 film Sex and the Single Girl.

1970s
Quine returned to acting with a role in the movie Original: Do Not Project (1972).

In the 1970s, Quine directed The Moonshine War (1970) at MGM and a pilot for a show based on Catch-22 starring Richard Dreyfuss.

He directed three episodes of Peter Falk's Columbo, including "Dagger of the Mind," an episode set in Britain. He also worked on another, much less successful NBC Mystery Movie series, McCoy, reuniting him with star Tony Curtis, whom Quine had directed in So This Is Paris and Sex and the Single Girl (1964).

Quine's other directorial credits include W (1974) with Twiggy, and The Specialists (1975), and episodes of Hec Ramsey, McCloud and Project U.F.O..

His final completed film as a director was the  film The Prisoner of Zenda (1979) starring Peter Sellers. Quine was hired to direct another Sellers film, The Fiendish Plot of Dr. Fu Manchu (1980). Before the script was even completed, Quine was fired owing to "creative differences" with Sellers.

Personal life
Quine was married five times and had three children. His first marriage was in January 1942 to showgirl and model Susan Paley, several years his senior. His second marriage was to actress Susan Peters. They were married on November 7, 1943, at the Westwood Community Church in Los Angeles. On New Year's Day 1945, the couple were on a duck hunting trip when Peters dropped her rifle. The gun discharged, hitting Peters in the stomach. The bullet lodged in her spine, leaving her paralyzed from the waist down. On April 17, 1946, the couple adopted a ten-day-old baby boy whom they named Timothy Richard Quine. They separated on March 1, 1948, and were divorced later that year. In October 1952, Peters died of a chronic kidney infection and bronchial pneumonia, both of which were hastened by dehydration and starvation because she had stopped eating and drinking in the last few weeks of her life.

In September 1951, Quine married Barbara Bushman, the granddaughter of actor Francis X. Bushman. The couple had two children before separating in May 1958. They were divorced in March 1960.

While Quine was separated from his third wife, he began dating actress Kim Novak, whom he had previously directed in Pushover (1954) and Bell, Book and Candle (1958). In 1959 the two became engaged while working on their third film together, Strangers When We Meet (1960). They planned to marry when shooting completed on Strangers but Novak ended the relationship shortly before the film was completed. He later dated actresses Judy Holliday, whom he had directed in Full of Life and The Solid Gold Cadillac (both 1956) and Natalie Wood (whom he also directed in Sex and the Single Girl (1964). While directing Sex and the Single Girl, Quine met and began dating one of the film's stars, Fran Jeffries. On January 4, 1965, they married in Rosarito Beach, Mexico. The couple separated on June 10, 1968. In July 1969, Quine filed for divorce, citing "extreme cruelty." Their divorce became final in December 1970.

In 1977, Quine married Diana Balfour. They remained married until Quine's death in 1989.

Death
After an extended period of depression and poor health, Quine shot himself in the head at his Los Angeles home on June 10, 1989. He was taken to UCLA Medical Center, where he died at the age of 68. His remains are interred in the Room of Prayer columbarium at Westwood Memorial Park in Los Angeles.

Filmography

References

External links 

1920 births
1989 deaths
20th-century American male actors
American lyricists
American male child actors
American male film actors
American male musical theatre actors
American male stage actors
American male radio actors
American male screenwriters
American television directors
American television producers
Burials at Westwood Village Memorial Park Cemetery
Film directors from Michigan
Male actors from Detroit
Metro-Goldwyn-Mayer contract players
Suicides by firearm in California
United States Coast Guard officers
Vaudeville performers
20th-century American businesspeople
20th-century American singers
Screenwriters from Michigan
20th-century American male singers
20th-century American male writers
20th-century American screenwriters
1989 suicides
United States Coast Guard personnel of World War II